Houston County is the name of five counties in the United States:

 Houston County, Alabama 
 Houston County, Georgia 
 Houston County, Minnesota 
 Houston County, Tennessee 
 Houston County, Texas

Houston County may also refer to:
Houston County (band), a country music band